Willy Vannitsen (8 February 1935 – 19 August 2001) was a Belgian professional road bicycle racer. In 1962, Vannitsen won two stages in the 1962 Tour de France.

Major results

1951
 National Road Race Novice Championship
1954
Heist-op-den-Berg
Hoegaarden
Momalle
Zele
1955
Brussegem
Geel
Heusden Limburg
Tessenderlo
Omloop van de Gete
Drie Zustersteden
Grote Bevrijdingsprijs
Itegem
1956
Beerse
Herent
Jeuk
Wellen
Omloop van de Fruitstreek Alken
Beersel
1957
Beerse
Brazzaville
Six Days of Brussels (with Rik Van Looy)
Houthalen-Helchteren
Lommel
Londerzeel
Loverval
Oviedo
Putte-Mechelen
Ronde van Limburg
Omloop van de Fruitstreek Alken
Overpelt
1958
Fontanelas
Giro d'Italia:
Winner stage 1
Melsele
Paal
Sint-Truiden
Wavre
Giro di Toscana
Vijfbergenomloop
Omloop van Limburg
Heusden Limburg
Florenville
Hoepertingen
Zele
1959
Berlare
Beverlo
Puurs
Rummen
Wingene
Nazareth
Tienen
1960
Averbode
Sint-Truiden
Ronde van Limburg
Koersel, Koersel
Lommel
1961
Six Days of Antwerp (with Rik Van Looy and Peter Post)
Milano–Vignola
Molenstede
Oedelem
Omloop van Limburg
Omloop van Midden-Brabant
Tre Valli Varesine
Winterthur
La Flèche Wallonne
Charleroi
Eke
Wingene
1962
Aalst
Acht van Chaam
Borgloon
Oostende
Peyrehorade
Tour de France:
Winner stages 10 and 15
Vorst – Brussel
1963
Bree
GP Union Dortmund
Helchteren
Omloop van de Fruitstreek Alken
Zonhoven – Antwerpen – Zonhoven
1965
Opgrimbie
Scheldeprijs
1966
Omloop van Limburg

External links 

Belgian male cyclists
1935 births
2001 deaths
Belgian Tour de France stage winners
Belgian Giro d'Italia stage winners
People from Sint-Truiden
Cyclists from Limburg (Belgium)
20th-century Belgian people